This is a list of black National Hockey League players.

List

Players with at least one game of NHL experience:

Names in italics have won the Stanley Cup.
Bold: organization by which player is currently playing
*: Yet to have played an NHL game for his respective team

Number of black NHL players listed by NHL teams

Fifteen
Buffalo Sabres

Fourteen
Edmonton Oilers
New York Rangers
Vancouver Canucks

Thirteen
Chicago Blackhawks

Eleven
Boston Bruins
Washington Capitals
Winnipeg Jets1/Arizona Coyotes2

Ten
Calgary Flames
Philadelphia Flyers
St. Louis Blues

Nine
Atlanta Thrashers/Winnipeg Jets
Montreal Canadiens
New Jersey Devils
Quebec Nordiques/Colorado Avalanche
Tampa Bay Lightning

Eight
Detroit Red Wings
Florida Panthers
Minnesota North Stars/Dallas Stars
San Jose Sharks
Toronto Maple Leafs

Seven
Hartford Whalers/Carolina Hurricanes
Los Angeles Kings
Minnesota Wild
New York Islanders
Pittsburgh Penguins

Six
Columbus Blue Jackets
Ottawa Senators

Five
Anaheim Ducks
Nashville Predators

Four
Vegas Golden Knights

Zero
Seattle Kraken

1 Previous NHL team with the same name
2 Changed its franchise name from the Phoenix Coyotes

See also

Black players in ice hockey
List of African-American sports firsts
List of starting black NFL quarterbacks
Race and ethnicity in the NHL
List of Indian NHL players

References

External links
Black Hockey Players Wall of Fame – Photos, stats and biographies of black players who have been drafted by or played in the NHL

NHL
African Americans and sport
NHL
NHL
NHL players
Black players